Robespierre is a station on line 9 of the Paris Métro. It is named after the nearby on the rue Robespierre, which was named after Maximilien de Robespierre (1758 – 1794), who was one of the best-known leaders of the French Revolution. It is located in the commune of Montreuil, Seine-Saint-Denis, just to the east of Paris.

History 
The station was opened on 14 October 1937 with the extension of the line from Porte de Montreuil to Mairie de Montreuil.

In 2019, the station was used by 4,221,091 passengers, making it the 109th busiest of the Métro network out of 302 stations.

In 2020, the station was used by 2,281,953 passengers amidst the COVID-19 pandemic, making it the 100th busiest of the Métro network out of 305 stations.

Passenger services

Access 
The station has 2 accesses:

 Access 1: rue Robespierre
 Access 2: rue Barbès (Art Deco style)

Station layout

Platforms 
The station has a standard configuration with 2 tracks surrounded by 2 side platforms.

Other connections 
The station is also served by line 318 of the RATP bus network.

Gallery

References
Roland, Gérard (2003). Stations de métro. D’Abbesses à Wagram. Éditions Bonneton.

Paris Métro line 9
Paris Métro stations in Montreuil, Seine-Saint-Denis
Railway stations in France opened in 1937